Metzitzim is a 1972 Israeli comedy film that has become a cult film. It was entered into the 23rd Berlin International Film Festival.

The film was directed by Uri Zohar and starred Arik Einstein and Zohar himself. The cinematographer was Adam Greenberg.

In 2014, on season two of the show Orly and Guy Come Back With an Answer (אורלי וגיא חוזרים עם תשובה), suspicions were raised that during the production of the movie there had been abuses and sexual harassment against actresses. In addition, Mona Zilberstein's cousin claimed that the rape scene (after Gutte, Uri Zohar, washed Mona and took her to bed) was in fact a rape. This and other sexual harassment in her life led her to use drugs until her death from an overdose.

Cast
 Arik Einstein - Eli
 Uri Zohar - Gutte
 Sima Eliyahu - Mili
 Mona Silberstein - Dina (as Mona Zilberstein)
 Zvi Shissel - Davidke
 Mordecai Ben-Ze'ev - Altman Sr. (as Mordechai Ben-Zeev)
 Moti Mizrahi - Altman Jr.
 Motti Levi - Avi
 Mordechai Arnon - Cab driver
 Margalit Ankory - Ruthie
 Zvia Doron - Fainting woman
 Eddie Cogan - Singer
 Aharonchik - Lifeguard
 Esther Zewko - Secretary (as Esther Zebco)
 Tova Farber - Street girl

References

External links
 

1972 comedy films
1972 films
Films directed by Uri Zohar
1970s Hebrew-language films
Israeli comedy films